This is a list of the 133 schools in the Division I Football Bowl Subdivision  (FBS) of the National Collegiate Athletic Association (NCAA) in the United States.  By definition, all schools in this grouping have varsity football teams.

Schools in Division I FBS are distinguished from those in the Division I Football Championship Subdivision (FCS) by being allowed to provide scholarship aid to a total of 85 players, and may grant a full scholarship to all 85. FCS schools are limited to financial assistance amounting to a maximum of 63 full scholarships, although some conferences voluntarily place further restrictions on athletic aid. The NCAA classifies FBS football as a "head-count" sport, meaning that each player receiving any athletically-related aid from the school counts fully against the 85-player limit. By contrast, FCS football is classified as an "equivalency" sport, which means that scholarship aid is limited to the equivalent of a specified number of full scholarships. In turn, this means that FCS schools can freely grant partial scholarships, but are also limited to a total of 85 players receiving assistance. Another NCAA rule mandates that any multi-sport athlete who plays football and receives any athletic aid is counted against the football limit, with an exception for players in non-scholarship FCS programs who receive aid in another sport. The three service academies that play in Division I FBS—Air Force, Army, and Navy—are theoretically subject to this rule, but are exempt in practice because all students at these schools receive full scholarships from the federal government.

Starting in 2014, the FBS began playing a four-team tournament culminating in a National Championship Game to determine its national champion, a system that has been in place from the 2014–2025 seasons by contract with ESPN, broadcaster of the games. But since the College Football Playoff is not sanctioned by the NCAA, this makes FBS football the only sport without an NCAA-sanctioned champion. The FCS is the highest division in college football to hold a playoff tournament sanctioned by the NCAA to determine its champion.

Conference affiliations are current for the upcoming 2023 season.

FBS programs

Notes

Future FBS programs

Former programs

Notes

Notes

 Several schools have different athletic nicknames for men's and women's teams. Usually, this is a matter of preceding the main nickname with "Lady", such as LSU Lady Tigers and Tennessee Lady Vols. The two FBS schools nicknamed Cowboys, Oklahoma State and Wyoming, use Cowgirls for women's teams. However, in some cases, the women's team nickname has a completely different form, as in Hawaii Rainbow Wahine and Louisiana Tech Lady Techsters. Because this is a list of American football programs, which are traditionally all-male, only the men's form is given.
The Pac-12 considers the Pacific Coast Conference or PCC as part of its own history, even though the PCC was established with different charter members and was disbanded due to major crisis and scandal. There is considerable continuity between the two leagues. The Athletic Association of Western Universities (AAWU), which would eventually become the Pac-12, was founded by five former PCC members, and by 1964 all of the final PCC members except for Idaho had been reunited in the AAWU.
Texas leads the nation with 12 (13 in 2023) FBS programs based in the state.

References

Sources
NCAA Sports Sponsorship: Football Bowl Subdivision

 
NCAA Division I FBS
FBS